Logan is a 2017 American superhero film starring Hugh Jackman as the titular character. It is the tenth film in the X-Men film series and the third and final installment in the Wolverine trilogy following X-Men Origins: Wolverine (2009) and The Wolverine (2013). The film, which takes inspiration from  the "Old Man Logan" comics storyline by Mark Millar and Steve McNiven, follows an aged Wolverine and an extremely ill Charles Xavier who defends a young mutant named Laura from the villainous Reavers led by Donald Pierce and Zander Rice. The film is produced by 20th Century Fox, Marvel Entertainment, TSG Entertainment and The Donners' Company, and distributed by 20th Century Fox. It is directed by James Mangold, who co-wrote the screenplay with Michael Green and Scott Frank, from a story by Mangold. In addition to Jackman, the film also stars Patrick Stewart, Richard E. Grant, Boyd Holbrook, Stephen Merchant, and introducing Dafne Keen in her film debut as Laura.

Principal photography began in Louisiana on May 2, 2016, and wrapped on August 13, 2016, in New Mexico. The locations used for Logan were mainly in Louisiana, New Mexico, and Mississippi.

Logan premiered at the 67th Berlin International Film Festival on February 17, 2017, and was theatrically released in the United States on March 3, 2017, in IMAX and standard formats. The film received critical acclaim, with strong praise for its emotional depth, Mangold’s direction, action sequences, screenplay, uncompromising tone, thematic profundity, and the performances of Jackman, Keen and Stewart. It became the best-reviewed film in the X-Men franchise, with many critics calling it one of the greatest superhero films ever made, and it was selected by the National Board of Review as one of the top ten films of 2017. It was nominated for Best Adapted Screenplay at the 90th Academy Awards, becoming the first live-action superhero film to be nominated for screenwriting. It grossed $619.2 million worldwide and became the third-highest-grossing R-rated film at the time of its release.

Plot

In 2029, no mutants have been born in 25 years, and an aging Logan suffers as his healing ability is failing. Working as a limousine driver in El Paso, Texas, he and mutant tracker Caliban take care of 97-year-old Charles Xavier, founder of the X-Men, in an abandoned smelting plant in northern Mexico. Xavier suffers from dementia that causes him to have destructive telepathic seizures, one of which injured 600 people and killed several X-Men the year prior.

Logan reluctantly agrees to escort Gabriela López, a former nurse for biotechnology corporation Alkali-Transigen, and a young girl named Laura to Eden, a supposed refuge near the American-Canadian border. After finding Gabriela dead, Logan is confronted by her killer Donald Pierce, who is Transigen's cyborg chief of security. Pierce is looking for Laura, who has stowed away in Logan's limo and has powers similar to his. She, Logan, and Xavier escape Pierce and his Reavers, but Caliban is captured. Pierce tortures Caliban into tracking Laura. Xavier and Logan watch a video on Gabriela's phone, revealing that Transigen created Laura and other children from mutant DNA to become weapons. The children proved challenging to control and were to be executed, but Gabriela and other nurses helped some escape. Xavier reveals to Logan that Laura was created from Logan's DNA and calls her Logan's daughter.

In Oklahoma City, Logan discovers that Eden appears in Laura's X-Men comic and tells her it is fictional. The Reavers arrive, but Xavier has a seizure that incapacitates everyone except Logan and Laura, who kill the attackers and inject Xavier with his medication. As they flee, Dr. Zander Rice, the head of Transigen, arrives to help Pierce.

Logan, Laura, and Xavier help farmer Will Munson and his family after a traffic incident, accepting an offer of dinner at their home, where Logan drives off enforcers from a corporate farm. Rice unleashes X-24, a mindless clone of Logan in his prime created as Transigen's ultimate weapon. X-24 murders Will's family and Xavier before capturing Laura. Caliban sets off grenades, killing himself and several Reavers but only injuring Pierce. Logan is outmatched by X-24, but Will pins X-24 with his truck before dying from his injuries. Logan and Laura escape with Xavier's body.

After burying Xavier, Logan passes out. Laura takes him to a doctor and persuades him to prove that the site in North Dakota is not Eden. There, they find Rictor and other Transigen children preparing to cross into Canada. Laura finds an adamantium bullet that Logan has kept since he escaped from the Weapon X facility, which he once considered using to commit suicide. Logan decides not to accompany them, to Laura's dismay.

When the Reavers ambush the children, Logan takes an overdose of a serum given to him by Rictor that temporarily enhances his healing abilities and boosts his strength. With Laura's help, he slaughters most of the Reavers before the serum wears off. As Pierce holds Rictor at gunpoint, Rice tells Logan, who killed Rice's father years ago at the Weapon X facility, that no new mutants have been born due to genetically engineered crops created by Transigen and distributed through the world's food supply. Logan, having found a gun, shoots Rice dead and injures Pierce. X-24 fights Logan as the children combine their powers to kill Pierce and the remaining Reavers. Rictor uses his powers to flip a truck onto X-24, but he frees himself and impales Logan on a large tree branch. Laura loads Logan's revolver with the adamantium bullet and shoots X-24 in the head, killing him.

Near death, Logan tells Laura not to become the weapon that she was made to be, and after she tearfully acknowledges him as her father, Logan dies peacefully in Laura's arms. She and the children bury Logan, and before they depart, Laura tilts the cross on his grave marker to create an X, honoring him as the last of the X-Men.

Cast

 Hugh Jackman as James Howlett / Logan / Wolverine: The X-Man and a physically enhanced mutant with accelerated healing. Charles Xavier's former pupil and Laura's biological father, dealing with his age and ailment. He is one of Charles Xavier's caregivers, alongside Caliban. Mangold spoke of Logan's age influencing his regenerative capabilities, which he stated may no longer produce soft skin, "so we imagined he heals quickly, still, but it leaves a scar. The simple idea was that his body would start to get a little more ravaged with a kind of tattooing of past battles, lacerations that remain of previous conflicts." On the second page of the screenplay, Mangold spoke of Logan as "... he's older now and it's clear his abilities aren't what they once were. He's fading on the inside and his diminished healing factor keeps him in a constant state of chronic pain—hence booze as a painkiller." In 2015, Jackman requested fan input for the direction Wolverine's story should go in the next film while seeming to confirm that the project would serve as his farewell to Logan. To prepare for his role, Jackman ate a minimum of six meals per day when working with trainer Mike Ryan. Ryan stated that an average workout session for Jackman lasts up to three hours, beginning at 4:00 a.m. Jackman stated, "It's going to be very different. Very different in tone and hopefully different to anything we've done." Regarding the more personal tone, Jackman noted, "That's always been really his dilemma, coming to terms with who he is". Jackman has also explained that comedian Jerry Seinfeld was indirectly responsible for his decision to stop playing Logan after 17 years, with Jackman stating, "I was having a chat with [Seinfeld] about a year ago ... he was talking about why he finished Seinfeld ... He said he'd always had this feeling and belief that you never know when either your energy or the audience's energy is going to dip over into people [saying] 'Oh, please go.'" Jackman accepted a pay reduction to ensure that the film would be produced to receive an R-rating. Additionally, Jackman portrays Logan's clone, X-24.
 Patrick Stewart as Charles Xavier / Professor X: A mutant who is the world's most powerful telepath, who is founder and former leader of the now-defunct X-Men and formerly known as Professor X. Charles's telepathic abilities have become unstable due to age (over 90 years) and an unknown brain disease, and at times, he does not recognize Logan. During the events of Logan, Xavier is cared for by Logan and Caliban. Regarding Xavier and the themes of aging and loneliness, Mangold said, "We've seen these characters in action, saving the universe. But what happens when you're in retirement and that career is over? ... The really interesting thing to me, or a place to dig that hadn't been dug, was the idea of mutants when they're no longer useful to the world, or even sure if they can do what they used to do. Their powers are diminished like all of ours are by age ... Our Charles is a very sweet character in this film. I think he's always been an incredibly sweet character. With the addition of his own physical fragility in this movie, he becomes an incredibly powerful paternal figure in the movie. Logan is more of a reluctant one, I think you can easily guess." Stewart remarked that "... this is probably the end of this franchise for me. But the thing about science fiction and fantasy is that you can never, ever say it's the end, it's over."
 Richard E. Grant as Dr. Zander Rice: The surgical head of Transigen, whose father was killed by Logan during his escape from Weapon X Headquarters at Alkali Lake. On the character of Rice, Mangold stated, "He's the puppet master behind Pierce and the Reavers, and has a much larger role in the sense that he's actually the kind of brilliant mind that is trying to grow mutants."
 Boyd Holbrook as Pierce: Transigen's relentless, calculating, and intense head of security and leader of the militant Reavers, who is sent to retrieve Laura, which brings him into conflict with Wolverine. Holbrook said of the character, "He's an innovative engineer and he's a big fan of Wolverine. He just wants to hang out with him ... There's a lot of surprising stuff in it." Mangold praised Holbrook's performance, saying that "[he] is just a fabulous actor. I wanted this film to feel intimate and real and truthfully acted, and I wanted very much to break away from the kind of bloated feeling I've gotten from a lot of comic-book movies."
 Stephen Merchant as Caliban: An albino mutant who can sense and track other mutants, who is helping Logan take care of Xavier. On Merchant taking the role, Mangold mentioned, "I'm always interested to find the thing that looks most interesting on the actors. Stephen is a huge man. One of the things that is so wonderful filming with him for a character like this is that he's a good six inches taller than Logan, and huge over Patrick. The little kid in the movie would come up to basically his knee. So there's a wonderful sense of scale—but he has heart too." Mangold concluded by stating, "... So that was a wonderful energy to enter the movie, and someone who instead of turning things into their own energy kind of joined ours." A younger Caliban was previously portrayed by Tómas Lemarquis in X-Men: Apocalypse.
 Dafne Keen as Laura / X-23: A mysterious young girl, who is "very much" like Logan as well as Logan's biological daughter. She is also subject "X-23". On Keen's portrayal of Laura, Mangold mentioned, "If anyone could steal a movie from [Jackman], it would be Dafne. She carries, all the time, a slight strangeness." In an interview with Digital Spy, Mangold stated, "... [Keen] was 11 years old when we were shooting. She's a remarkable kid. Her parents are actors, and she's kind of a very modern kid. Very physically capable. Incredibly gifted as an actress. I mean, it was a huge risk for Fox to allow me to make a movie where the third point of the triangle was built upon someone so young." Mangold stated that the worldwide search for an actress to portray Laura was one in which he was seeking "someone who was bilingual because I wanted a Latina kid—one who was between 10 and 12, and was a credible child." He later stated of Laura that: "She's an 11-year-old girl equipped with all the volatility, instability, mood swings, shadows and potential violence of our hero." Co-writer Scott Frank pushed for the character to speak as little as possible when he joined the project to avoid making her into a typical kid sidekick, explaining, "I read a few other drafts of the script that Jim worked on, and in all those drafts she was talking from the beginning and had an attitude. I thought that was a giant mistake." 11 year old Nayah Murphy served as Dafne's stunt double.   Millie Bobby Brown auditioned for the role before Keen was cast.

Eriq La Salle, Elise Neal, and Elizabeth Rodriguez appear as Will Munson, Kathryn Munson, and Gabriela, respectively. Doris Morgado, David Kallaway, Han Soto, Jason Genao, Krzysztof Soszynski, and Alison Fernandez appear as Maria, Rhodes, Valet, Rictor, Mohawk, and Delilah, respectively. In the commentary to X-Men: Apocalypse, director Bryan Singer had stated that his film's post-credits scene would directly connect with the on-screen debut of X-Men antagonist Mister Sinister in Logan. In January 2017, Mangold stated that the character would not appear in this film. However, the DNA from several mutants, including Logan, in that film was used to create the clones that are seen in this film.

Production

Development 

In November 2013, 20th Century Fox initiated discussions over another solo film starring Wolverine, with James Mangold in negotiations to write the treatment for the film and Lauren Shuler Donner returning to produce under The Donners' Company. At the time, Hugh Jackman neither confirmed nor denied his reprisal of Logan in a new film. Jackman clarified that his lapsing contract with Fox, which reportedly would need to be renegotiated after X-Men: Days of Future Past (2014), did not mean he was leaving the franchise, as he had been working movie-by-movie since X2 (2003). He also stated, "I do want to do it with Jim and with [producer] Lauren Shuler-Donner because we had such a great experience. I'm really proud of The Wolverine (2013)." Later in the month, Mangold announced that the pre-production aspect of the film had not yet begun, nor the writing process, though he furthered this by stating, "... I would say I'm not there yet. But I have taken finger to key. Let's say that. There's been typing. And ideas. And talking amongst all the principles."

Shortly after the release of The Wolverine, Mangold spoke of a potential sequel with the aim of not converting it into a "Will the world survive?" film, while also stressing his need "... not to make the same picture again." In December 2013, Jackman spoke of nearing the end of his tenure as the character, while stating that the film was in the very early stages of development. Jackman also revealed that Mangold and he had begun speaking of potential ideas, adding, "... Jim Mangold and I were literally on the phone last night talking about ideas but there is no script and no writer yet so it's a way off." Mangold would later reveal that Jackman was very involved in developing the story, saying, "Hugh and I have been friends for almost twenty years now, and he was there every step of the way. For Hugh and I, the first goal was to construct something more intimate. Hugh often brought up The Wrestler and Unforgiven as examples. I used those references as well as others. I pitched to both Hugh and the studio that I had an idea for an extremely bloody, existential Little Miss Sunshine."

By March 2014, a decision was made to begin shooting after Bryan Singer's X-Men: Apocalypse (2016), with the tentative plan to shoot the films back-to-back, with producer Hutch Parker stating, "... the goal will be X-Men: Apocalypse for 2016, which means at the latest [filming begins] in summer 2015, and then the same thing with Wolverine, either before or after, but based on the script." Also in March, 20th Century Fox set a release date of March 3, 2017, Mangold boarded the project as director, Jackman signed on to reprise his role, and David James Kelly was hired to pen the screenplay. In April 2014, Jackman spoke about his ambitious feelings for the character of Logan while mentioning that they can go further than what they achieved in The Wolverine. Jackman also expressed his feelings of finality with portraying the character of Logan, while in terms of storyline, he explained that nothing had been decided as of yet. Jackman concluded by highlighting that the success of the script development would determine whether Jackman would return at all: "I haven't signed on. I'm genuinely at that point where unless it's better than the last one I'm not going to do it. I think it has to be better. I can still see where we can improve on the last one. I love the intimacy of that story, I liked the small stuff, I liked that it was a little unexpected."

In February 2015, Patrick Stewart spoke of discussions about the third Wolverine film, centering around a team-up between Jackman's Wolverine and himself as Charles Xavier, with Stewart stating to Marc Mohan that "... we have been talking about a Wolverine movie, which would team Hugh Jackman and myself together ... That would be a very different sort of X-Men from the four movies that I've already done." By April 2015, Michael Green had taken over screenwriting duties, with Mangold still actively overseeing the script development process. In September 2015, Jackman spoke of the writers being halfway through the script, and that the story would delve into the relationship between Wolverine and Professor X, to which he added, "I think it's a really important relationship but I want to see signs of that quasi-father/son sort of relationship that has not been seen before, and sides of particularly Professor X that have not been seen before." Jackman spoke of Mangold's plan to start filming the next year, though he expressed uncertainty as to filming locations. Also in September, Mark Millar, creative consultant for Fox, confirmed that Mangold's film would be a loose adaptation of the "Old Man Logan" story he had written in 2008, something that was hinted at earlier by Jackman. In October 2016, the title of the film was announced as Logan.

In January 2016, Jackman confirmed that Mangold had a full screenplay, albeit not complete. The following month, Liev Schreiber expressed interest in returning to portray Victor Creed / Sabretooth, with Jackman himself mentioning Mangold's vision to Schreiber. After the film's release, it was revealed by Jackman that originally the script had the character play a role in the film, but that Sabretooth was excluded from the final screenplay. By April 2016, Mangold had chosen Boyd Holbrook to portray the main antagonist of the movie, the chief of security for a global corporation that is pursuing Wolverine. Also by April, Richard E. Grant was cast as a villainous mad scientist, and Stephen Merchant had also been cast. In May, Eriq Lasalle and Elise Neal were cast supporting roles, and Elizabeth Rodriguez entered negotiations for a small but key role. Also in May, producer Simon Kinberg revealed that filming had already begun, and confirmed that the movie would be R-rated; regarding the setting and tonality, he stated, "It takes place in the future, and as you and others have reported, it is an R-rated movie. It's violent, it's kind of like a western in its tone. It's just a very cool, different film."

The film included some vintage X-Men comic books, used both to advance the plot and as a metafictional reference. The director clarified that Marvel Comics allowed this on the condition that they could use actual characters and designs, but not use any real comic book issues. As a result, the comic book covers and pages seen in the film were made specifically for it, by writer Joe Quesada and artist Dan Panosian. Mangold commented that "The reality was that, like in Unforgiven, when [Clint] Eastwood runs into Richard Harris, who’s writing these fictional accounts of the great Western heroes, or Pat Garrett in Billy the Kid, where you’ve got these aging heroes who kind of are twilight versions of their own legends — I think that idea, of being a kind of celebrity, or like a sports star long past your heyday, was really interesting for me to investigate with this kind of world." Panosian made 10 fake comic book covers, and interior arts were unused. He pointed that the arts had to resemble the style used in the Bronze Age of Comic Books, and pointed out that they also served to contrast their campy style with the darker tone of the live-action film itself. He said that "The colors and art itself juxtaposed against the raw and savage world in the film capture just how much innocence has been lost over time".

Filming

On March 5, 2015, James Mangold anticipated that filming would begin "early next year." Prior to filming, the film was given the false title of Juarez to lower the visibility of production, but the local media eventually uncovered the ruse. On March 1, 2016, The Times-Picayune had confirmed that Mangold's film was preparing to shoot in New Orleans, Louisiana, with a starting schedule of May. Producers Kinberg, Shuler Donner and Parker chose to film in Louisiana because of its popularity in filmmaking locations, as well as its filming incentive, which includes a 40% tax credit for movie productions, though it requires a minimum expenditure of US$300,000. Principal photography was confirmed to have begun in New Orleans, with an original shooting schedule occurring from April 25 to August 13, 2016, albeit shooting was altered to start on May 2, 2016.

On May 23, 2016, filming took place at the NASA Michoud Plant in New Orleans East, with Jackman being spotted, not far from Slidell, shooting a fight scene outdoors on the property. On May 26, 2016, the intersection of LA 16 at US 51 was closed for a time due to filming, with local store fronts donning faux signage to transform Amite City, and east of Amite near Bell Road. It was revealed that scenes were filmed prior in Husser on May 25, 2016, with a scheduled daytime shoot to occur at the Greenlawn Cemetery in Hammond on May 27, 2016. Filming took place from June 9, 2016, until June 10, 2016, in New Orleans and Metairie, respectively.

On June 1, 2016, it was confirmed that 20th Century Fox had applied to film exterior scenes for Juarez on Louisiana Highway 15 between Ferriday and Clayton from June 12, 2016, up until June 16, 2016, at the Ferriday Plaza Shopping Center, while a portion of U.S. Route 425 between Ferriday and Clayton would be closed for a five-day period in connection with Fox's production. On June 1, 2016, The Concordia Sentinel revealed that Sicily Island High School and a house in Sicily Island would be used in the production, while a crash scene would be shot on U.S. Route 425 just outside of Ferriday. Producers Kinberg, Shuler Donner and Parker chose to film in Ferriday, Louisiana, because of Concordia Parish's beautiful countryside and green cornfields. On June 16, 2016, Juarez was originally scheduled to move on toward Sicily Island, however, additional periods of shooting were added. Natchez, Mississippi had been chosen by producers of Juarez as the next filming location, for an upcoming scene which required the casting truck drivers, that would be filmed between June 14 up until June 28, 2016.

On July 12, 2016, the Albuquerque Journal confirmed that Juarez would move on to its third major filming location—New Mexico, which ran through August in Albuquerque, Rio Rancho, Abiquiú, Tierra Amarilla and Chama. The New Mexico Film Office revealed that the production employed about 130 New Mexican crew members and two New Mexican cast members, as well as 600 extras throughout the production, the film office stated. On July 17, 2016, it was reported that the production of Juarez was in the process of casting to work on a scene filmed on July 22, 2016, in Albuquerque, New Mexico. On July 25, 2016, it was reported that filming had begun in the Northern Meadows neighborhood of Rio Rancho, while a few miles further down King Boulevard there was an elaborate set built with a toppled water tower, that would be used for exterior shots until June 27, 2016. On August 11, 2016, it was reported that the production of Juarez were in the process of seeking worn out cars to work on an upcoming scene filmed on August 12, 2016, in Albuquerque, New Mexico. Principal photography was confirmed to have ended in New Mexico on August 13, 2016, with an altered shooting schedule occurring from May 2 to August 13, 2016. Post-production began subsequent to filming closure on August 23, 2016.

Post-production

Film editor Michael McCusker was finishing work on Mangold's Logan, during the period of October 7, 2016, wherein he spoke of going through the dailies and breaking them down, and figuring out the structure of one scene which he described as a "complicated, multi-component scene". McCusker spoke of the task being rather time-consuming, on the front end, albeit stating, "I am looking at the back end experience with [Mangold] as the more important experience. I don't want to be searching for stuff for him, I want to be working towards getting the cut right." McCusker concluded by stating that another editor on Logan has use for post-production. Chas Jarrett was the overall visual effects supervisor and visual effects company Image Engine worked on most of the visual effects on Logan.

Music

In July 2016, Cliff Martinez was announced as the composer of Logan musical score. In December 2016, Mangold announced that Marco Beltrami, who had previously collaborated with Mangold on 3:10 to Yuma (2007) and The Wolverine (2013), would take over from Martinez and score Logan instead.

Influences
The film takes visual, tonal and thematic inspiration from classic western and noir cinema, with director James Mangold having stated that Logans influences included "visual reference points" of cinema, citing Shane (1953), The Cowboys (1972), Paper Moon (1973), The Gauntlet (1977), Unforgiven (1992), Little Miss Sunshine (2006), and The Wrestler (2008). Mangold was also inspired by The Dark Knight trilogy, saying "It seemed to me that the only films of this ilk that did interest me, that I did admire, or to use Chris Nolan's movies as an example, the ones that have really moved me beyond just the spectacle. There was a very clear decision to apply a film genre to the material, if that makes any sense."" The film also takes tropes and themes of the cyberpunk, with focus put on automation affecting the world of a near future.

Mangold spoke of visual framing, while noting that he does not necessarily think about the "comic-book" related sort, instead highlighting the variety of stylistic influences that went into Logan. These influences include film noir framings and classic Hollywood filmmaking styles, as well as the Germanic expressionist filmmaking style of the early twentieth century, which Mangold stated has a commonality with comic-book art. Mangold highlighted "Strong foregrounds, playing things in depth: you have to make an image say more within that one image."

Using the image of Logan at a funeral as an example of his stylistic logic, Mangold concluded by mentioning the aspects within modern filmmaking, primarily everything in close-up format. For Logan, his aim was to set frames that are descriptive, and evocative of comic-book panels and classical filmmaking.

Release

Theatrical
Logan premiered at the 67th Berlin International Film Festival on February 17, 2017, in Berlin, Germany, where it was selected to be screened out of competition alongside The Bar, Final Portrait, The Midwife, T2 Trainspotting, and Viceroy's House, before screening in the United States, where it was given a wide release on March 3, 2017. In October 2015, Fox confirmed that Logan would be released in the IMAX format. In the United States, Canada and the United Kingdom, the film was preceded by a short film, Deadpool: No Good Deed. In it, Deadpool notices a man getting robbed, and springs into action—but first has to change into his costume in a phone booth. As he is finishing up, the man is shot; the short film ends with Deadpool commenting on the strangeness of the phone booth's presence, and eating the man's ice cream. The teaser met with positive reviews. Ryan Reynolds posted an extended version of the teaser via his YouTube channel the day after the film's release.

One Last Time promotion and future
Prior to the confirmation that the then-untitled Logan would be his final appearance in the X-Men film franchise, Jackman initially denied such rumors. Jackman stated that he was inspired by Michael Keaton's performance in Birdman, and wished to portray the character of Wolverine until his death. In July 2015, Jackman posted an image of Logan giving the middle finger with a claw to his Twitter. The image, coupled with the hashtag "#OneLastTime", signified that the film would be his last appearance as Logan and officially announced his decision to stop playing the character he had been portraying for the past 17 years. Eventually it earned Jackman Guinness World Record of the 'longest career as a live-action Marvel superhero'.

During an appearance on The Dr. Oz Show in May 2015, Jackman clarified the confusion over the conflicting sentiments, by stating bluntly that the film would be his final portrayal as the character; he said, "This will be my last one, it is my last time. It just felt like it was the right time to do it, and let's be honest, 17 years. I never thought in a million years it would last, so I'm so grateful to the fans for the opportunity of playing it. I kind of have in my head what we're going to do in this last one. It just feels like this is the perfect way to go out." Jackman has also explained that Jerry Seinfeld has convinced him to quit the role stating, "He said to me, when you're creating something it's very important not to run yourself dry. It's not about finishing on top, necessarily, but making sure you're, creatively, still got something left, which propels you into the whatever's next."

In December 2016, Ryan Reynolds revealed that he had been trying to convince Jackman to re-sign for a Wolverine and Deadpool crossover film. Urging fans to campaign online, he stated, "I want Deadpool and Wolverine in a movie together. What we're gonna have to do is convince Hugh. If anything, I'm going to need to do what I can to get my internet friends back on board to help rally another cause down the line. Hugh Jackman is one of the best human beings. Part of the reason I want to do a Deadpool/Wolverine movie is not just because I think the two would light the screen on fire but I genuinely love the guy." In January 2017, Reynolds and Jackman spoke about the proposed project; Jackman stated, "I'm hesitating, because I could totally see how that's the perfect fit. But the timing may be wrong." Jackman later stated that he would not reprise the role for a team-up film, specifying, "No, and Ryan is currently sleeping outside my house. [Laughs] Look, if that movie had appeared 10 years ago, probably a different story, but I knew two-and-a-half years ago that this was the last one. The first call I made was to [director James Mangold]. I said, 'Jim, I got one more shot at this,' and as soon as Jim came up with the idea and we worked on it, I was never more excited. But, it feels like the right time. Deadpool, go for it man, do your thing. You don't need me."

Jackman expressed interest in continuing to play Wolverine had the character been brought into the Marvel Cinematic Universe. Jackman elaborated, "If that was on the table when I made my decision, it certainly would have made me pause. That's for sure. Because I always love the idea of him within that dynamic, with the Hulk obviously, with Iron Man but there's a lot of smarter people with MBAs who can't figure that out. You never know. At the moment, honestly, if I really did have them there, I probably wouldn't have said this is the last. It just feels like this is the right time [to leave the character]."

Amid rumors of Disney's prospective acquisition of 20th Century Fox's film division, it was revealed such a deal would indeed allow the X-Men related characters to appear in the Marvel Cinematic Universe.

During press for The Greatest Showman, Jackman addressed his earlier statements and whether he would come out of retirement and reprise the role should the deal go through. Jackman stated that while he noted the irony and felt some initial disappointment upon learning the news, he planned on standing by his decision to retire from the role. "It's interesting because for the whole 17 years I kept thinking that would be so great, like I would love to see, particularly, Iron Man and the Hulk and Wolverine together. And every time I saw an Avengers movie I could just see Wolverine in the middle of all of them like punching them all on the head. But it was like, "Oh well, that's not gonna happen," and it was interesting just when I first saw that headline—it was just the possibility of it and who knows what's gonna happen, obviously—I was like, "Hang on!" But I think, unfortunately, the ship has sailed for me, but for someone else I would like to see Wolverine in there."

In spite of his adamancy, it was confirmed by Ryan Reynolds on September 27, 2022, that Jackman would reprise his role as Logan once more in the third Deadpool film. Slated for release on November 8, 2024, the film will see the characters integrated into the Marvel Cinematic Universe. 

Jackman elaborated on the changed stance to Variety, revealing that he had changed his stance following the release of Deadpool, but since Logan was already being promoted as his final time portraying the character, he felt he had to honor that sentiment - stating in his own words, "I straight-up lied," and that he had been the one to contact Reynolds about the reprisal. "I think, actually, he'd given up. I think it was a big shock to him. There was a massive pause, and then he said, 'I can't believe the timing of this.'"

In a follow up to the announcement, Reynolds and Jackman clarified that as Logan took place in 2029, the new film would not contradict the character's death in the former.

As for the other principals and their prospective futures; although Patrick Stewart had stated that Logan would be the final time he played the role of Professor X, he later said that he would be willing to return to the role in Deadpool 2 or the Legion TV series. Though the producers of said show considered casting Stewart, they ultimately chose to utilize a younger version of the character portrayed by actor Harry Lloyd. Nonetheless, Stewart would go on to portray the character again in the Marvel Cinematic Universe film Doctor Strange in the Multiverse of Madness, where he played a variant of Charles Xavier who was the leader of the Illuminati before being killed by Wanda Maximoff.

Marketing
In April 2016, Fox decided not to showcase its upcoming movie releases, including Logan, at Hall H at San Diego Comic-Con, as the studio felt it could not prevent the piracy of custom trailers and exclusive footage routinely screened for fans in attendance.

On October 20, 2016, 20th Century Fox released a 90-second teaser trailer to promote Logan, following a six-second sneak peek the prior day. Later that day, 20th Century Fox released an international red band version of the trailer, featuring slightly more graphic violence than the original. Empire Magazine chose the trailer as the best trailer of the year. The Hollywood Reporters Aaron Couch praised the trailer, and stated, "If Logan delivers on the promise of this trailer, it will be a true rarity in modern superhero movie making." James Dyer of Empire heralded the trailer and its director, James Mangold, by stating: "We've had a veritable feast of great trailers ... from John Wick to Rogue One, Assassin's Creed and A Cure for Wellness. But none ..., no matter how impressive, have been quite so artfully constructed as this glorious first look at [Mangold]'s Logan." Forrest Wickman of Slate called the trailer "surprisingly mournful".

Home media
Logan was made available on Blu-ray, DVD, and 4K on May 23, 2017, and was released on Digital HD on May 16, 2017. The film became available to stream on Disney+ on July 22, 2022 alongside Deadpool and Deadpool 2.

Logan Noir
On April 29, 2017, James Mangold announced via Twitter that a black-and-white version of the film entitled Logan Noir would have a limited theatrical run in U.S. theaters, an event set to begin on May 16, 2017. Mangold stated that Logan was shot as a color film with the awareness that it would play well as a black and white film. The film was re-graded and timed shot by shot for the Noir edition. This version of the film is included on the Digital HD release and also included in the DVD and Blu-ray Combo Pack.

Reception

Box office
Logan grossed $226.3 million in the United States and Canada and $392.7 million in other countries for a worldwide gross of $619.2 million, against a production budget of $97 million. Worldwide, the film had a global debut of $247.4 million from 82 markets, as well as the second-biggest R-rated IMAX debut, with $20.6 million from 1,068 screens. The film grossed $440.9 million in its first 13 days of release, surpassing the entire theatrical gross of The Wolverine ($414.8 million).

United States and Canada
Predictions for its opening in the US and Canada were revised upwards from $55 million to $80 million or even higher. Fox, however, predicted an opening in the mid-$60 million range. Some critics said the film's R rating—the second such for a X-Men film—might hinder the film's mass appeal. Two days before the film's release, ticket selling site Fandango reported that the film was outpacing all previous X-Men movies (except Deadpool) at the same point in their sales cycle.

Logan was released in 4,071 theaters, the widest release for an R-rated film (breaking American Snipers 3,888). Five hundred and eighty theatres were premium large-format screens, including 381 IMAX theaters, setting the IMAX record for an R-rated film.

Logan earned $9.5 million from Thursday night previews, which began at 7 p.m. This marked the second-biggest previews in the X-Men franchise, behind Deadpools $12.7 million. On its opening day, the film scored the biggest R-rated March opening, with $33.1 million (breaking 300's record), as well as the third-biggest R-rated debut after Deadpool ($47.3 million) and The Matrix Reloaded ($37.5 million). Earning a total of $88.4 million during its opening weekend, the film scored the biggest Wolverine movie opening, the biggest R-rated March opening, the fourth-biggest March opening, the fifth-largest X-Men opening, and the fifth-biggest R-rated opening overall (ninth in terms of inflation adjusted). It is also the biggest R-rated opening weekend that did not take place on a holiday. Additionally, Logan achieved the fifth-highest opening weekend for any 20th Century Fox film, trailing Deadpool ($132.4 million), Star Wars: Episode III – Revenge of the Sith ($108.4 million), X-Men: The Last Stand ($102.7 million) and X-Men: Days of Future Past ($90.8 million). About 8.2% of the total ticket sales were in Canada, with premium large formats comprising $12.3 million (15%) from 558 screens, and IMAX comprising $10 million (12%) of the film's total opening weekend.

The opening-weekend audience was 63% males and  83% people between 18 and 44 years old. In an opening-weekend poll conducted by Fandango, 71% of responders said that more superhero films should be rated R, while 86% were interested in seeing a more violent, adult X-Men film that weekend. Furthermore, 96% said they were excited to see Hugh Jackman, 94% were intrigued to see Patrick Stewart reprise his role as Professor X, and 76% were interested in watching newcomer Dafne Keen.

In its second weekend, the film dropped 56.9%, grossing $38.1 million and finishing second at the box office behind newcomer Kong: Skull Island ($61 million). In its third weekend it made $17.8 million, finishing in third behind Beauty and the Beast ($174.8 million) and Kong: Skull Island ($27.8 million). In its fourth weekend it made $10.1 million, dropping 43.1% from the previous week and finishing 5th at the box office.

Other countries
Logan was projected to open as high as $105 million. However, US forecasters believed that it could post an even higher opening if it were to overperform in major markets—most notably China. It opened day-and-date in almost every major market except Japan, where Doraemon the Movie 2017 was released. Fox ultimately decided to postpone the film's release there in order to avoid competition. Through Sunday, the film exceeded expectations and posted a five-day opening worth $152.5 million from 81 markets. This is Fox International's third-biggest launch of all time, behind X-Men: Days of Future Past ($172 million) and Avatar ($164 million). It debuted at No. 1 in 80 markets. It broke the record for the biggest R-rated IMAX release ever and the biggest 2D IMAX opening, with $10.6 million on 687 screens.

Mainland China is the movie's best-grossing market outside America, contributing $106 million in box office. The film was the first to feature an age-restriction warning in its marketing material, as required by a Film Promotion Law that took effect on March 1, 2017. Nevertheless, the film is still trimmed by 14 minutes, totaling 123 minutes. It is very likely that the move was due to usual censorship by the State Administration of Press, Publication, Radio, Film and Television, because of the violence depicted. Despite such restrictions, the film managed to debut with a better-than-expected $48.9 million, including previews, according to data from Ent Group (Fox reported $46.3 million). This marked the second-biggest X-Men opening in the country, trailing behind only Apocalypse. Tracking showed that the film opened with 85,000 screenings on Friday, which increased to about 95,000 on Saturday and Sunday, from a 9.98 million attendance. Included within that total was $4.4 million from 388 IMAX screens.

In Brazil, it recorded the biggest opening for Fox, and the seventh-biggest opening overall, with $8.2 million. The top openings were in China ($46.3 million), the U.K. ($11.4 million), Korea ($8.2 million), and Russia ($7.1 million). In India, the film debuted with an estimated 17 crore ($2.5 million) net, equating to a gross of $3.4 million, on 1,400 screens. According to Fox, that was the highest debut for any X-Men title in the territory, marginally ahead of X-Men: Apocalypse. While the debut was not enough to break any significant records, it ranked as the second-biggest opening weekend for a Hollywood release in the January–March quarter, behind Batman v Superman: Dawn of Justice.

Critical response

The website's critical consensus reads, "Hugh Jackman makes the most of his final outing as Wolverine with a gritty, nuanced performance in a violent but surprisingly thoughtful superhero action film that defies genre conventions." Metacritic, another review aggregator, assigned a weighted average score of 77 out of 100, based on 51 critics, indicating "generally favorable reviews". Audiences polled by CinemaScore gave an average grade of "A−" on an A+ to F scale, while PostTrak-surveyed audiences gave the film a rare five out of five. Some reviewers noted Logan as one of the greatest superhero films.

Scott Collura of IGN gave Logan a score of 9.7/10, and called it, "an emotional, heavy picture, but it's also an uplifting one that reminds us that it's okay to fight for something more, something better", and "perhaps the best X-Men movie yet." A. A. Dowd of The A.V. Club gave an 'A−' and said that "[the film] manages to deliver the visceral goods, all the hardcore Wolverine action its fans could desire, while still functioning as a surprisingly thoughtful, even poignant drama—a terrific movie, no 'comic-book' qualifier required". Chris Nashawaty of Entertainment Weekly gave it a 'B−', and called it "both the most violent film in the series and the most sentimental one. When it's not showering you in blood, it's trying to make you spill tears." Sheri Linden of The Hollywood Reporter reacted positively, saying: "Seamlessly melding Marvel mythology with Western mythology, [director] James Mangold has crafted an affectingly stripped-down standalone feature, one that draws its strength from Hugh Jackman's nuanced turn as a reluctant, all but dissipated hero."

Peter Bradshaw of The Guardian gave it 4/5, stating "It is more like a survivalist thriller than a superhero film, and signals its wintry quality with the title itself" and compared Wolverine's hitting of his truck during the film to Basil Fawlty from Fawlty Towers. James Berardinelli of ReelViews gave it 3.5/4 and said, "In terms of tone and content, Logan is Deadpools polar opposite but both productions refuse to play by traditional superhero movie rules ... With his glimpse into what superhero movies can be, James Mangold has given us something sadly lacking in recent genre entries: hope." Kyle Smith of the New York Post also gave 3.5/4 and said "the film recognizes that superhero movies such as last year's forgettable X-Men: Apocalypse have become meaningless spectacle ... I'd rank it beside X-Men: Days of Future Past among the best X-Men entries." Brian Tallerico of RogerEbert.com stated, "Logan has stakes that feel real, and fight choreography that's fluid and gorgeous instead of just computer-generated effects. Most importantly, Logan has characters with which you identify and about whom you care. It's not just 'great for a superhero movie', it's a great movie for any genre."

Brian Truitt of USA Today said, "Easily the best Wolverine outing, Logan is [the] Dark Knight of the mutant-filled X-franchise, a gripping film that transcends the comic-book genre by saying something important." Peter Travers of Rolling Stone gave 3.5/4, and called it "a hard-ass, R-rated rager that explodes with action". Amy Nicholson of MTV called it "a phenomenal, throat-slashing, gut-stabbing superhero movie". Germain Lussier of io9 said, "Logan is beautiful, sophisticated, and still a kick-ass superhero film". Debbie Holloway of Crosswalk gave the film a rating of 4/5, praising how the "script also has several powerful themes, and is truly deft in its handling of them." Michael Roffman of Consequence of Sound called the film "A game-changing masterpiece". Matt Donato of We Got This Covered said, "It's not just one of the best superhero movies ever, it's a damn-fine cinematic representation of the human condition in all its agonizing forms." Joe Morgenstern of The Wall Street Journal said, "It's the best superhero film to come out of the comic-book world, and I'm not forgetting Christopher Nolan's 'The Dark Knight'." Jackman's acting as Wolverine has been praised, and his performance topped The Hollywood Reporters Greatest Superhero Movie Performances of All Time list.

Anthony Lane of The New Yorker was underwhelmed, commenting on the film's parallel with Shane, "These quiet images (from Shane) brand themselves on the mind, and the gunshots come as an overwhelming release, whereas when Logan and Laura unleash their furious scythes nothing feels settled or satisfied." Mara Reinstein of Us Weekly gave the movie 2.5/4 and specified, in a lukewarm review, that "[t]he film loses its way during the 20-minutes-too-long journey. For all the breathless talk about how Logan transcends the superhero genre, there's nothing groundbreaking about a road trip movie in which adults try to elude the bad guys to protect a super-special child." Michael Phillips of the Chicago Tribune gave it 2/4 and said, "Logan is deadly serious, and while its gamer-style killing sprees are meant to be excitingly brutal, I found them numbing and, in the climax, borderline offensive." Stephanie Zacharek of Time magazine said, "The grim side of human nature is all over James Mangold's Logan. But that doesn't necessarily make it a good movie."

Accolades

Canceled spin-off
In October 2017, it was reported that director James Mangold had begun writing a sequel to Logan, tentatively titled Laura, focusing on Laura and the continuation of her story, with Logan being represented with archive footage of Jackman. After Disney's purchase of Fox was finalized in 2019, all X-Men films in development were stalled, leaving the future of Laura uncertain. In November 2019 Mangold said he did not think the project would be happening, and that he believed the studio would be trying to figure out where to go in the future with the characters, particularly with Wolverine.

Notes

References

External links

 
 
 

2017 films
2010s English-language films
2010s action adventure films
2017 drama films
2010s psychological drama films
2017 science fiction action films
2017 science fiction films
2010s superhero films
2010s American films
20th Century Fox films
Film spin-offs
American action adventure films
American science fiction adventure films
American psychological drama films
American drama road movies
American sequel films
American superhero films
American survival films
American chase films
American dystopian films
Fiction about familicide
Films scored by Marco Beltrami
Films about Alzheimer's disease
Films about cloning
Films about death
Films about old age
Films about orphans
Films based on works by Mark Millar
Films directed by James Mangold
Films produced by Lauren Shuler Donner
Films produced by Simon Kinberg
Films set in the future
Films set in 2029
Films set in the United States
Films set in El Paso, Texas
Films set in Mexico
Films set in North Dakota
Films set in Oklahoma
Films set in Texas
Films shot in Louisiana
Films shot in Mississippi
Films shot in New Mexico
Films shot in New Orleans
Human experimentation in fiction
IMAX films
Metafictional works
Films with screenplays by James Mangold
Films with screenplays by Michael Green (writer)
Films with screenplays by Scott Frank
Superhero drama films
Neo-Western films
Films about telekinesis
TSG Entertainment films
Wolverine (comics) films
Wolverine (film series)
Films about father–daughter relationships
Live-action films based on Marvel Comics